Synapsis  is a genus of Asian dung beetles in the tribe Coprini,  erected by Henry Walter Bates.

Species 
BioLib lists:
 Synapsis birmanicus Gillet, 1907
 Synapsis boonlongi Hanboonsong & Masumoto, 1999
 Synapsis brahminus (Hope, 1831)
 Synapsis davidis Fairmaire, 1878
 Synapsis dickinsoni Hanboonsong & Masumoto, 1999
 Synapsis gilleti Arrow, 1931
 Synapsis horaki Zidek & Pokorny, 2010
 Synapsis kiuchii Hanboonsong & Masumoto, 1999
 Synapsis masumotoi Ochi, 1992
 Synapsis naxiorum Kral & Rejsek, 2000
 Synapsis ochii Masumoto, 1995
 Synapsis ovalis Boucomont, 1920
 Synapsis puluongensis Bui & Bonkowski, 2018
 Synapsis punctatus Ochi, Kon & Kawahara, 2008
 Synapsis ritsemae Lansberge, 1874
 Synapsis roslihashimi Ochi, Kon & Kawahara, 2008
 Synapsis satoi Ochi & Kon, 2007
 Synapsis simplex Sharp, 1875
 Synapsis strnadi Kral, 2002
 Synapsis tmolus (Fischer von Waldheim, 1821)
 Synapsis tridens Sharp, 1881
 Synapsis vietnamicus Ochi, Kon & Pham, 2020
 Synapsis yama Gillet, 1911
 Synapsis yunnanus Arrow, 1933

References

External links
 

Scarabaeidae genera
Beetles of Asia
Coprini